The New Zealand cricket team toured Ireland in July 2022 to play three One Day International (ODI) and three Twenty20 International (T20I) matches. The ODI series formed part of the inaugural 2020–2023 ICC Cricket World Cup Super League.

In the first ODI, Ireland's Harry Tector and New Zealand's Michael Bracewell both scored centuries. Bracewell's 127 not out helped New Zealand to win the match by one wicket with one ball remaining. New Zealand won the second ODI by three wickets to win the series with a match to play. New Zealand won the third and final ODI by one run to win the series 3–0.

New Zealand won the first T20I by 31 runs, with Glenn Phillips scoring an unbeaten 69 runs. New Zealand also won the second T20I, by the margin of 88 runs, with Dane Cleaver scoring 78 not out and Michael Bracewell taking a hat-trick. New Zealand won the third T20I by six wickets, to also win the T20I series 3–0.

Background
Originally, the New Zealand cricket team were scheduled to tour Ireland in June and July 2020, along with a tour Scotland to play an ODI and T20I match. Initially, Cricket Ireland announced that Bready Cricket Club Ground would not be hosting any matches at the venue due to their financial position. However, when Cricket Ireland confirmed the fixtures in December 2019, the T20I matches were confirmed to be taking place at the ground.

The COVID-19 pandemic put the tour in doubt. In April 2020, David White, Chief Executive of New Zealand Cricket, said that the tour would be "most unlikely" to happen. Later the same month, Cricket Ireland's Chief Executive, Warren Deutrom, stated that international cricket in Ireland during 2020 was at "high risk" due to the pandemic. Deutrom later added that New Zealand's tour to Ireland was "fairly doubtful". However, the tour was postponed on 15 May 2020 due to the pandemic.

Squads

Adam Milne was ruled out of New Zealand's T20I squad due to an Achilles injury with Jacob Duffy named as his replacement. Ireland's Conor Olphert was ruled out of the T20I series with a knee injury, with Fionn Hand named as his replacement.

ODI series

1st ODI

2nd ODI

3rd ODI

T20I series

1st T20I

2nd T20I

3rd T20I

References

External links
 Series home at ESPN Cricinfo

2020 in Irish cricket
2022 in Irish cricket
2020 in New Zealand cricket
2022 in New Zealand cricket
International cricket competitions in 2022
New Zealand cricket tours of Ireland
Cricket events postponed due to the COVID-19 pandemic